The 2009 Australian Mini Challenge delivered by Pizza Capers was the second running of the one make championship. It began on 26 March at the Melbourne Grand Prix Circuit and ended on 2 December at the new Homebush Street Circuit. A winner of two rounds during the season, Paul Stokell won the championship ahead of Chris Alajajian, who remained in title contention despite not winning any of the series' eight rounds.

Teams and drivers
The following teams and drivers contested the 2009 Australian Mini Challenge.

Calendar
The 2009 Australian Mini Challenge delivered by Pizza Capers was contested over eight rounds, starting at Albert Park in March and finishing at Homebush in December

V8SCS – V8 Supercar Championship Series
AGP – Australian Grand Prix
 * 2 driver race (optional)

Driver standings

External links
 Official Web Page
 NMD Mini Challenge Category Page

Mini Challenge